J. Campbell White (March 31, 1870 – March 24, 1962) was a General Secretary of the YMCA in Calcutta and an American President of the College of Wooster in Ohio.

Biography
He was born on March 31, 1870 to John May White in Wooster, Ohio.

White went to Wooster College in Ohio. He left to be a secretary of a YMCA and then went on to be the General Secretary of the YMCA in Calcutta.

He was invited to return to his alma mater as President. He was the President from 1915 to 1919. He became a minister of the Presbyterian Church in his 60s. His life was driven by service rather than his career.

White died in Monroe, Ohio in 1962 at a rest home.

References

1870 births
1962 deaths
College of Wooster faculty
YMCA leaders